Lake Afton is a  man-made recreational lake in Sedgwick County, Kansas, United States, and within the  Lake Afton Park.  It is located east of the intersection of Viola Rd (263rd St W) and MacArthur Rd (39th St S), between the communities of Goddard, Garden Plain, Schulte, Viola.

History
Ground breaking for the dam occurred on December 29, 1939.  The dam was built by Works Progress Administration workers from 1939 to 1941.  It opened to the public in 1945.

The Sedgwick County Commission let a contract for the construction of the Segwick County Boys Detention Home within the Park in April 1960.

Lake Afton Public Observatory was constructed within the Park in the late 1970s on the north side of MacArthur Rd.

Directions
Lake Afton is located at 24600 W 39th St S, which is east of the intersection of Viola Rd (263rd St W) and MacArthur Rd (39th St S) in rural western Sedgwick County.

Directions:

See also

 Cheney Reservoir, northwest of Lake Afton
 List of Kansas state parks
 List of lakes, reservoirs, and dams in Kansas
 List of rivers of Kansas

References

External links
 , Official website
 Fishing information, Kansas Department of Wildlife and Parks
 Sedgwick County Maps: Current, Historic, KDOT

Afton
Parks in Kansas
Protected areas of Sedgwick County, Kansas
Works Progress Administration in Kansas
Bodies of water of Sedgwick County, Kansas